New College Berkeley is an Gospel-centered, ecumenical graduate school of Christian studies and spiritual formation.  It is located near the campus of the University of California, Berkeley and is affiliated with the nearby Graduate Theological Union.

  
The purpose of New College Berkeley is to provide resources to bring God's presence into the public world of work, politics, civic life and academia, as well as the private spaces of discipleship, family and friendship.    All of the approximately 200 students each year are enrolled part-time in various courses, seminars and conferences.

History
New College Berkeley was established in 1977 by a group of Christians, including pastors and scholars, with the aim of offering interdisciplinary, graduate-level Christian studies for people seeking to integrate their faith with their lives.  In this mission, New College Berkeley is similar to schools such as Regent College in Vancouver, BC and the Toronto Institute for Christian Studies.  The founding director, Dr. David W. Gill, co-founder Rev. Earl Palmer and the college's first president, Dr. W. Ward Gasque (1979-1982) brought to the school a firm commitment to the priesthood of all believers and emphasized a strong, biblically based Christian orthodoxy.

In 1983 Dr. William Dyrness became president.  He was succeeded in the presidency by Dr. David Gill (1986-1989), Dr. Richard Benner (1990-1993), Steven Pattie (1993-1994) and Dr. Susan S. Phillips (1994–2022, serving as executive director).  From 1994 to 2016, Sharon Gallagher served as associate director. Starting in 2022, Craig Wong and Tim Tseng joined as co-executive directors.

New College Berkeley was an independent, degree-granting institution for more than ten years.  It acquired WASC candidacy in 1988 and in 1993 became an affiliate of Berkeley's Graduate Theological Union.  Since 1994, all for-credit courses are under the umbrella of the GTU, through whose catalog such courses are offered every semester.

Academic programs
New College Berkeley offers programs in biblical studies, church history, ethics, spirituality and various integrative subjects, taught by both resident and visiting faculty with expertise in these disciplines.   The school cultivates spiritual community and growth through small classes and spiritual direction groups, and does so with participants from various denominational affiliations and walks of life. New College Berkeley is one of the first Christian Study Centers in the United States, is a member of the Consortium of Christian Study Centers and provides support to students of the University of California.

Notable faculty and lecturers
 Bernard Adeney, Christian ethicist and scholar of interfaith relations
 Robert N. Bellah, sociologist
 Patricia Benner, ethicist and scholar of nursing practice
 Joel B. Green, New Testament scholar, Fuller Theological Seminary
 Carl F. H. Henry, theologian and first editor of Christianity Today
 Mark Labberton, President, Fuller Theological Seminary
 Marilyn McEntyre, visiting professor of Christianity and literature
Earl Palmer, pastor and theologian
 John M. Perkins, urban missionary and scholar
 Eugene H. Peterson, pastor, scholar, author, and poet
 Luci Shaw, poet
 John Stott, prominent leader of the Evangelical movement

See also

 List of evangelical seminaries and theological colleges

References

External links
 New College Berkeley
 Consortium of Christian Study Centers

Seminaries and theological colleges in California
Educational institutions established in 1977
Education in Berkeley, California
1977 establishments in California
Graduate Theological Union